Schistura sokolovi is a species of ray-finned fish, a stone loach, in the genus Schistura from Vietnam. It occurs in medium-sized to small streams with a current and riffles, over gravel and sandy substrates. The specific name honours the Russian zoologist Vladimir Evgenievich Sokolov (1928-1988) for his contribution to the knowledge of the zoology of central Vietnam.

References

S
Fish described in 2001